Matt Norman (born June 20, 1988) is a former Canadian football offensive lineman for the BC Lions of the Canadian Football League (CFL). He was selected 22nd overall by the Lions in the 2012 CFL Draft. After the 2011 CIS season, he was ranked as the tenth best player in the Canadian Football League’s Amateur Scouting Bureau rankings for players eligible in the 2012 CFL Draft, and fifth by players in Canadian Interuniversity Sport. He played CIS football with the Western Ontario Mustangs. He also took a year away from football in 2012–2013 to get his teaching degree and was a student teacher at H.B. Beal Secondary School, where he was loved by many of his students. He retired from football in June 2016.

References

External links
BC Lions profile

1988 births
Living people
BC Lions players
Players of Canadian football from Quebec
Canadian football offensive linemen
Western Mustangs football players
People from Châteauguay